Deivame Thunai is a 1959 Indian Tamil-language film, directed by Ch. Narayanamurthi. The film stars Akkineni Nageswara Rao and Padmini.

Plot
Parvathi is a pretty and good-natured girl. Her auntie's son Rathinam is a cunning and duplicitous person. Rathinam wants to marry Parvathi, but she did not agree. Parvathi's cousin Sekar arranges to marry her to his friend Shankar. Rathinam gets furious and tries to abduct Parvathi. He gets caught and sent to prison. Shankar and Parvathi get married and beget a son. Rathinam returns from jail. He wants to destroy the happy life Parvathi is enjoying with her husband and child. He sends a letter to Shankar with lies about Parvathi's conduct before marriage. Shankar believes it and leaves the family. Parvathi takes refuge at Sekar's house with her son, Ravi. But Sekar's wife ill-treats her. In the meantime, Shankar goes to Chennai. He saves a girl, Padma, who is a social worker, from a thief while travelling in the train. Padma and her father asks him to stay in their house, but he refuses. Shankar becomes a singer in the radio station. he gets addicted to liquor, but before it becomes serious, Padma rescues him and makes him to stay in their house. Parvathi, unable to bear Sekar's wife, leaves home and goes to Chennai. She joins as a house maid in the house of Rajani, a friend of Padma. Parvathi admits Ravi to a school run by Padma. Ravi is a brilliant student and takes part in school activities. Padma and Shankar become fond of him and quite often, they bring him home. Ravi acts in a drama that is staged during a school function. Parvathi attends the function and sees Shankar there. Parvathi asks Rajani about Shankar. Rajani tells her that he is a person rescued by Padma and that they are going to get married. Parvathi is shocked and runs to the sea to commit suicide. What happens next forms the rest of the story.

Cast
List adapted from the film's song book.

Male cast
A. Nageswara Rao
T. R. Ramachandran
M. N. Nambiar
V. R. Rajagopal
K. Sarangapani
Appa Duraisamy
M. R. Swaminathan
K. K. Perumal
Rama Rao
Desigan
Master Gopal
Master Anantharaman
Master Ganesan

Female cast
Padmini
Ragini
E. V. Saroja
M. S. Sundari Bai
K. S. Angamuthu
G. Lakshmirajyam
Baby Premalatha
Baby Meenakumari
Baby Kanchana
Baby Jaya

Dancers
E. V. Saroja
Gopi Krishna

Production
The film was produced by S. P. S. Pictures managed by R. Sockalingam and was directed by Ch. Narayanamurthi. K. M. Govindarajan wrote the screenplay and dialogues. Choreography was handled by Hiralal, P. S. Gopalakrishnan, Sampath and Chinni Lal.

Soundtrack
Music was composed by S. M. Subbaiah Naidu, while the lyrics were penned by A. Maruthakasi, Ka. Mu. Sheriff, Velavan and Kadhiroli. Playback singers are P. Leela, P. Susheela, S. Janaki, Soolamangalam Rajalakshmi, Kamala, T. M. Soundararajan, A. L. Raghavan and Kumar.

References

External links

Indian drama films
Films scored by S. M. Subbaiah Naidu